West Howe Sound, British Columbia is also known as Sunshine Coast Regional District (SCRD) Electoral Area F on the Sunshine Coast of British Columbia, Canada. It is bound on the south by the Town of Gibsons, on the west by Elphinstone SCRD Electoral Area E, on the east by Howe Sound, on the north by Squamish-Lillooet Regional District Electoral Area D, and on the southeast by Metro Vancouver Regional District Electoral Area A.

West Howe Sound includes the neighbourhoods of:

 Granthams Landings
 Soames Point
 Hopkins Landing
 Gateway
 Langdale
 Williamsons Landing
 Twin Creeks
 Port Mellon
 Gambier Island
 Keats Island
 Anvil Island.

Government 
The SCRD West Howe Sound Area F electoral directors included Kate-Louise Stamford (2022 Oct 15 - Oct 2026), Mark Hiltz (2018 Oct 20-2022), Ian Winn (2014 Nov 15 - 2018), Lee Turnbull (2008 Nov 15 -2014, 2002), Bernie Mulligan (2004-2002, 1977), Eric Cardinall (1999),  Davie Hunter (1978 Nov 18- ), John Alexander McNevin (1974- ), J. Lorne Wolverton (1967-1974)

Langdale Elementary School is part of School District 46 Sunshine Coast.

West Howe Sound is within the territory of the Squamish Nation, Sḵwx̱wú7mesh Úxwumixw.

Transportation and infrastructure 
Unlike municipalities, like the Town of Gibsons, regional districts do not have authority over roads, so all roads are the responsibility of the BC Ministry of Transportation and Infrastructure (MOTI). MOTI in turn contracts out road maintenance to a private company, Capilano Highways, which is responsible for filling potholes, painting lines, sweeping, mowing shoulders, and clearing snow. Highway 101 Drivebc Webcam. British Columbia Ferry Service provides transportation services via the Langdale Terminal and Horseshoe Bay Terminal.

References

External links
 West Howe Sound Community Association

Unincorporated settlements in British Columbia
Populated places in the Sunshine Coast Regional District